Theodore Berlin (born August 17, 1938 – May 1987) was a Democratic member of the Pennsylvania House of Representatives.

References

Democratic Party members of the Pennsylvania House of Representatives
1987 deaths
1938 births
20th-century American politicians